The following are international rankings of Rwanda.

References

Rwanda